Piotrkowska Street, the main artery of Łódź, Poland, is one of the longest commercial thoroughfares in Europe, with a length of around 4.2 km. It is one of the major tourist attractions of the city. It runs longitudinally in the straight line between the Liberty Square (Plac Wolności) and the Independence Square (Plac Niepodległości).

From the very beginning this street was the central axis, around which the city grew bigger, and its development spontaneously gave the present shape to its centre. At first the city was mainly the highway, but later it changed into the city's showcase, the leisure and shopping centre, where the life of growing industrial agglomeration could be observed. The street deteriorated remarkably after World War II. Only after 1990 was it revitalized step by step and changed into a kind of pedestrian precinct. It has a function similar to a market square of old towns in other cities. 

Nowadays the buildings, town-planning, institutions, restaurants, clubs and pubs situated next to this street, create its specific atmosphere, which is said to have a "cult" character reaching even outside of Łódź.

History

In the beginning, the present Piotrkowska Street functioned as a route joining Piotrków Trybunalski and Zgierz. On this path a small, roadside urban settlement called Łódź was located. In 1821 Rajmund Rembieliński - the president of the Commission of the Province of Mazovia - took some action in order to regulate the building development in the industrial settlement. This settlement was called The New Town and it was situated in the south from the "old" Łódź. On the street plan of the settlement, the route line was outlined, and along it the cross streets and standard 17,5–21 meters wide plots with a surface area of one morgen, allotted to weaving craftsmen. Standard houses were built on those plots – a workshop, which stood facing the route, whereas the rest of the plot was a "garden" for the owner's family. At the northern end of the route, the New Town Market was outlined (now the Liberty Square), which had stood in the south from the Old Town Market. At first (around 1815) the name Piotrkowska Street was used to describe the northern part of the route joining both markets, whereas the southern part (the present Piotrkowska Street) didn't have any name. This means that Piotrkowska Street was a kind of courtyard and market for the huge "manufacture of Łódź", so for the whole New Town. The fact that Łódź had this function, is the reason why in this city never developed anything like a classical city centre with a centrally situated market and co-centrally expanding commercial institutions and public organizations, and Piotrkowska Street took on this role. In 1899 brothers Władysław and Antoni Krzemiński from the Polish noble family of Krzemiński of Prus III coat of arms founded the first cinema in Poland at Piotrkowska Street.

Notable artists were born or lived at Piotrkowska Street, including renown Polish and American pianist Artur Rubinstein and Polish poet and playwright Tadeusz Miciński. In 1867, American and British Shakespearean actor Ira Aldridge suddenly died at the Paradyż Theater (Piotrkowska 175) before his scheduled performance.

Revitalization 
Before 1990 Piotrkowska Street didn't differ much from other streets, although it was the most important street in the city. The plans of changing Piotrkowska Street into a pedestrian zone, resulted only in moving the trams to a horizontal Promenade (today called Kościuszki Avenue).
Before this change the promenade had a function of a pedestrian avenue. In its centre there was a wide green belt, which later on was used as a tram line. There was not enough of political will to change Piotrkowska Street into a real pedestrian precinct, although this idea came back from time to time. The first step was the gradual reduction of street traffic by introducing "no parking" or "you must turn" signs on almost every crossroad from Mickiewicza Avenue to the Independence Square. 
In 1945-1990 the street suffered from the gradual degradation. Until the 1970s the old, eclectic apartment houses weren't considered by the authorities of those days as historic monuments. Several of them were destroyed and in their places office buildings and shopping centers were built, usually in the international style. In the 1980s some falling off decorative elements of the elevation, dangerous for the passers-by, were simply removed from the walls, even though the renovation of some chosen buildings had already begun.

The character of the street changed only after 1990. In this year an architect and a member of an artistic group "Łódź Kaliska", Marek Janiak, came up with the idea of creating the Foundation of Piotrkowska Street. Its goal was to revitalize this street and turning it into a pedestrian precinct. As the first one, a distance between Piłsudskiego Avenue and Tuwima Street was excluded from traffic. It was covered with colorful cobblestones and equipped with modernistic street lights and other elements of the so-called street furniture. It was strongly criticized by art conservatives and culture historians, because it didn't suit the general climate of the street.

The next parts of the street in the northern direction to the Liberty Square were revitalized and excluded from street traffic in 1993-1997. They were paved with black cobblestones imitating the old pavement and equipped with more and more beautiful elements of the so-called street furniture. Every new part, however, has another kind of surface and another style of decorative elements, which is being criticized as well. Even before the last part of the street, which was meant to be a pedestrian precinct, could be given to the public use, the cobblestones on the first part were remarkably destroyed. From 1995 those cobblestones were gradually replaced by the new ones, which were more grey in color and much more solid. That created a perfect opportunity to build the monument Lodz Citizens of the Millennium.

Together with the decoration change of Piotrkowska Street, apartment houses and little palaces standing next to it were revitalized. Some pubs, restaurants, shops and cafés moved inside them. At first mainly the front elevations of apartment houses were renovated, but as the popularity of the street increased and some of the most attractive buildings in the front were rented, revitalization gradually reached also backyards and back-premises. Nowadays, although not all of them, the huge number of backyards are paved with cobblestones and used for trading purposes.

Today 

Today Piotrkowska Street is the axis of Łódź agglomeration. Here, in its proximity, almost all of the most important administrative offices, banks, shops, restaurants and pubs are situated. The most of the events, outdoor parties, marches and official celebrations, organized by the city of Łódź, are taking place here...

Piotrkowska, which was called by many people Bigel some time ago, now is more and more commonly described as Pietryna. It is a cultural, political, sentimental, commercial and business centre of Lodz.
Between Tuwima Street and Nawrot Street there is the Monument of Łódź Citizens of Millennium Change, which is a nominal surface covering the part of Piotrkowska Street. This is probably the only monument of this kind in the world, consisting of 13.454 nominal cobblestones.
Some time ago a huge shopping centre Galeria Łódzka was built next to Piotrkowska Street. This made many shops move from Piotrkowska Street, and that's why we could observe the visible standstill. But after about a year the empty spaces that remained after the previous shops, started to be used again, some of them, however, still stood empty in the beginning of 2006. In this group was one of the most representative- the former Dom Buta. The similar process is being observed after another shopping centre – Manufaktura - was opened next to the northern end of the street. 
The northern part of the street is pedestrianised, although emergency and 'security' vehicles are allowed to speed along it - and do with alarming hostility and frequency, even weaving between the numerous beer gardens in the summer. The width of Piotrkowska Street varies between 17 and 26 meters.

OFF Piotrkowska

OFF Piotrkowska is an alternative dining and shopping area situated in the former Ramisch factory at 138–140 Piotrkowska, which operated as Franciszek Ramisch’s cotton mill until 1990.
Food trucks, bars, clubs, alternative music venues, studios, design companies and publishing houses occupy the buildings and open spaces. The usable area is 6,537 sqm and the plot area is 12,898 sqm.

Łódź Walk of Fame
The walk of fame(pl) on Piotrkowska street, designed by Andrzej Pągowski in 1998, on either side of Piotrkowska: outside the Grand Hotel and across the street, includes: Roman Polański, Pola Negri, Jadwiga Andrzejewska, Jerzy Antczak, Stanisław Bareja, Zbigniew Cybulski, Jacek Fedorowicz, Aleksander Fogiel, Aleksander Ford, Janusz Gajos, Wojciech Jerzy Has, Piotr Hertel, Jerzy Hoffman, Agnieszka Holland, Gustaw Holoubek, Krystyna Janda, Stefan Jaracz, Kazimierz Karabasz, Jerzy Kawalerowicz, Krzysztof Kieślowski, Wojciech Kilar, Edward Kłosiński, Bogumił Kobiela, Marek Kondrat, Krzysztof Kowalewski, Witold Leszczyński, Tadeusz Łomnicki, Jan Machulski, Juliusz Machulski, Janusz Majewski, Roman Mann, Janusz Morgenstern, Andrzej Munk, Leon Niemczyk, Daniel Olbrychski, Cezary Pazura, Franciszek Pieczka, Wojciech Pszoniak, Włodzimierz Puchalski, Stanisław Różewicz, Zbigniew Rybczyński, Jan Rybkowski, Andrzej Seweryn, Piotr Sobociński, Witold Sobociński, Bogusław Sochnacki, Władysław Starewicz, Allan Starski, Danuta Szaflarska, Jerzy Toeplitz, Beata Tyszkiewicz, Andrzej Wajda, Jerzy Wójcik, Zbigniew Zamachowski, Krzysztof Zanussi, and Zbigniew Zapasiewicz.

The road traffic
Starting from the Independence Square to the crossing with Mickiewicza and Piłsudskiego Avenues, there is a normal road traffic and this part of the street is covered with an ordinary asphalt and pavements made of concrete panels. On the part from the Independence Square to Żwirki and Wigury Streets, there still is quite an intensive bus and tram traffic. Despite this there are many shops, restaurants and pubs too, although they do not have such a representative character, as those located on the promenade.

Gallery

References

External links

 The City of Łódź Office
 Virtual Łódź
 A virtual walk on Piotrkowska Street (pl)
 Pictures of Piotrkowska Street (pl)

Łódź
Transport in Łódź
Streets in Poland